There are at least nine named lakes and reservoirs in Petroleum County, Montana.

Lakes
 Little Bear Lake, el. 
 Wild Horse Lake, el.

Reservoirs
 Headman-Field Reservoir, el. 
 Petrolia Lake, el. 
 Prtrolla Lake, el. 
 War Horse Lake, el. 
 War Horse Lake, el. 
 War Horse Lake, el. 
 Yellow Water Reservoir, el.

See also
 List of lakes in Montana

Notes

Bodies of water of Petroleum County, Montana
Petroleum